Vyacheslav Valeryevich Nedorostkov (born 5 July 1967 in Stepnoye) is a former Russian football player.

References

1967 births
People from Sovetsky District, Saratov Oblast
Living people
Soviet footballers
FC Sokol Saratov players
PFC Krylia Sovetov Samara players
FC Zhemchuzhina Sochi players
Russian footballers
FC Temp Shepetivka players
Russian expatriate footballers
Expatriate footballers in Ukraine
Ukrainian Premier League players
FC Nyva Ternopil players
FC Tekstilshchik Kamyshin players
Russian Premier League players
FC Mordovia Saransk players
Association football midfielders
Association football forwards
FC Nosta Novotroitsk players
FC Volga Ulyanovsk players
Sportspeople from Saratov Oblast